The 2013 Super Rugby season was the third season of the new 15-team format for the Super Rugby competition involving teams from Australia, New Zealand and South Africa. The tournament was won by the Chiefs, who defeated the Canberra-based Brumbies 27–22 in the competition final. For sponsorship reasons, this competition is known as FxPro Super Rugby in Australia, Investec Super Rugby in New Zealand and Vodacom Super Rugby in South Africa. Including the past incarnations as Super 12 and Super 14, this was the 18th season of the Southern Hemisphere's premier domestic competition. Conference matches took place every weekend from 15 February until 13 July – with a break between rounds 17 and 18 for internationals games – followed by the play-offs series that culminated in the final on 3 August.

The Kings achieved three victories in their inaugural tournament, but finished last following the regular season, and were defeated by the Lions in a two-leg play-off for a position in the South African conference for the 2014 season.

Competition format
Covering 25 weeks, the schedule featured a total of 125 matches. The 15 teams were grouped by geography, labelled the Australian Conference, New Zealand Conference and the South African Conference. The regular season consisted of two types of matches:
 Internal Conference Matches – Each team played the other four teams in the same conference twice, home and away.
 Cross Conference Matches – Each team played four teams of the other two conferences away, and four teams of the other two conferences home, thus missing out on two teams (one from each of the other conferences). Each team played two home and two away games against teams from each of the other countries, making a total of eight cross conference games for each team.

The top team of each conference, plus the next top three teams in table points regardless of conference (wild card teams), moved on to the finals. The top two conference winners, based on table points, received first-round byes. In the first round of the finals, the third conference winner was the #3 seed and hosted the wild card team with the worst record, and the best wild card team hosted the second-best wild card team. In the semi-finals, the #2 conference winner hosted the higher surviving seed from the first round, and the #1 conference winner hosted the other first-round winner. The final is hosted by the top remaining seed.

Standings

Source: sanzarrugby.com

Legend:

 Rnd = Round completed (games played plus byes), W = Games won, D = Games drawn, L = Games lost, Bye = Number of byes, PF = Points for, PA = Points against, PD = Points difference, TF = Tries for, TA = Tries against, TB = Try bonus points, LB = Losing bonus points, Pts = Log points, Q = Qualification

Points breakdown:
 4 points for a win
 2 points for a draw
 4 points for a bye (this does not apply to teams not scheduled to play in split rounds, e.g. New Zealand and South African teams in the Australian-only Round 1).
 1 bonus point for a loss by seven points or less
 1 bonus point for scoring four or more tries in a match

The overall standings classification system:
 Three conference winners/leaders in log points order
 Three wildcard teams in log points order
 The remaining nine teams in log points order
 When teams are level on log points, they are sorted by:
 number of games won
 overall points difference
 number of tries scored
 overall try difference

Round-by-round

Regular season
The results of the season were as follows:

Round 1

Round 2

Round 3

Round 4

Round 5

Round 6

Round 7

Round 8

Round 9

Round 10

Round 11

Round 12

Round 13

Round 14

Round 15

Round 16

Round 17

Round 18

Round 19

Round 20

Finals

Qualifiers

Semi-finals

Final

Promotion/relegation play-offs

Players

Leading try scorers

Source: South African Rugby Union

Leading point scorers

Source: South African Rugby Union

Referees
The following refereeing panel was appointed by SANZAR for the 2013 Super Rugby season:

Attendances

See also

 Super Rugby

External links

References

 
2013
 
 
 
2013 rugby union tournaments for clubs